Syllis castroviejoi is a species of polychaete from the family Syllidae. The body of this worm consists of a head, a cylindrical, segmented body and a tail piece. The consists of a prostomium (a section for the mouth opening) and a peristomium (section around the mouth) and has paired appendages (palps, cirri and antennae).

The scientific name of this species was first published in 2001 by Capa, San Martín & López.

References

Animals described in 2001
Syllidae